Große Laber (also: Große Laaber) is a river in Bavaria, Germany, a right tributary of the Danube.

Its source is near Volkenschwand. It flows northeast through the small towns Rottenburg an der Laaber, Schierling and Rain. It flows into the Danube near Straubing.

Tributaries 
 Heisinger Bach (left)
 Koppenwaller Bach (left)
 Marktbach (right)
 Hornbacher Bach (left)
 Rennbach (left)
 Aumerer Bach (right)
 Ramersdorfer Graben (right)
 Lauterbach (left)
 Raschbach (left)
 Talbach (left)
 Rohrbach (left)
 Altbach (right)
 Helchenbachgraben (left)
 Sinsbuchgraben (left)
 Siegersbach (right)
 Starzenbach (left)
 Deggenbacher Bach (right)
 Oberbach (right)
 Einhauser Graben (left)
 Hochwiesenbach (right)
 Augraben (right)
 Hartlaber (right)
 Saubründlgraben (right)
 Kleine Laber (right)

See also
List of rivers of Bavaria

References

External links 

 Labertalprojekt - Wasserwirtschaftsamt Landshut

Rivers of Bavaria
Tributaries of the Danube
Rivers of Germany